Cambridge Bay Water Aerodrome  is located just east of the community of Cambridge Bay, Nunavut, Canada. Landing is usually possible only from the middle of July until the middle of September but ice may be encountered until well into August.

DAL Aviation operates charter flights.

See also
Cambridge Bay Airport

References

Airports in the Arctic
Registered aerodromes in the Kitikmeot Region
Seaplane bases in Nunavut